Tanner Engstrand (born June 18, 1982) is an American football coach who is the passing game coordinator for the Detroit Lions of the National Football League (NFL).

Playing career 
Engstrand attended Grossmont College and transferred to San Diego State, where he played quarterback from 2003 to 2004.

Coaching career 
Engstrand began his coaching career at San Diego as a graduate assistant under Jim Harbaugh. He later coached running backs and quarterbacks at San Diego before being promoted to offensive coordinator in 2011. Engstrand was also an offensive analyst under Harbaugh at Michigan in 2018.

DC Defenders 
Engstrand was named the offensive coordinator for the DC Defenders of the XFL in 2019.

Detroit Lions 
After the XFL ceased operations, Engstrand was hired as an offensive assistant for the Detroit Lions in 2020. He was promoted to tight ends coach and passing game coordinator in 2022.

References

External links 
 
 Detroit Lions profile
 San Diego Toreros profile

1982 births
Living people
Sportspeople from San Diego County, California
Players of American football from California
Coaches of American football from California
Grossmont Griffins football players
San Diego State Aztecs football players
San Diego Toreros football coaches
Michigan Wolverines football coaches
DC Defenders coaches
Detroit Lions coaches